The 1974 Detroit Tigers compiled a record of 72–90. They finished in last place in the American League East, 19 games behind the Baltimore Orioles. They were outscored by their opponents 768 to 620.

Offseason 
 October 25, 1973: Frank Howard was released by the Tigers.
 December 3, 1973: Tony Taylor was released by the Tigers.
 March 19, 1974: The Tigers traded Ed Farmer to the New York Yankees and Jim Perry to the Cleveland Indians as part of a three-team trade. The Yankees sent Jerry Moses to the Tigers. The Indians sent Walt Williams and Rick Sawyer to the Yankees.

Regular season 
1974 was Al Kaline's final season after 22 years as a Tiger (1953–1974). He became the 12th player to join the 3,000 hit club on September 24.

On September 7, the Yankees' Graig Nettles hit a home run against the Tigers. The next time up, he hit a broken-bat single. Tigers catcher Bill Freehan scrambled for the six superballs that came bouncing out. Nettles was called out on the single, but his solo homer was allowed and the made all the difference as the Yankees won 1–0.

Season standings

Record vs. opponents

Notable transactions 
 June 10, 1974: Tim Corcoran was signed as an amateur free agent by the Tigers.

Draft picks 
 June 5, 1974: 1974 Major League Baseball draft
Mark Fidrych was drafted by the Tigers in the 10th round.
Rob Picciolo was drafted by the Tigers in the 1st round (6th pick) of the secondary phase, but did not sign.

Roster

Player stats

Batting

Starters by position 
Note: Pos = Position; G = Games played; AB = At bats; H = Hits; Avg. = Batting average; HR = Home runs; RBI = Runs batted in

Other batters 
Note: G = Games played; AB = At bats; H = Hits; Avg. = Batting average; HR = Home runs; RBI = Runs batted in

Pitching

Starting pitchers 
Note: G = Games; IP = Innings pitched; W = Wins; L = Losses; ERA = Earned run average; SO = Strikeouts

Other pitchers 
Note: G = Games pitched; IP = Innings pitched; W = Wins; L = Losses; ERA = Earned run average; SO = Strikeouts

Relief pitchers 
Note: G = Games pitched; W= Wins; L= Losses; SV = Saves; GF = Games Finished; ERA = Earned run average; SO = Strikeouts

Awards and honors

Records 
John Hiller
 American League record, most wins in one season by a relief pitcher (17)
 Major league record (since broken), most saves in one season by a left-handed pitcher (38)

Milestones 
Al Kaline became the 12th player in the 3,000 hit club on September 24

League top ten finishers 
Joe Coleman
 AL leader in hit batsmen (12)
 #2 in MLB in games started (41)
 #2 in MLB in home runs allowed (30)
 #2 in MLB in bases on balls allowed (158)
 #3 in MLB in earned runs allowed (137)
 #3 in AL in wild pitches (13)
 #6 in MLB in batters faced (1262)

Bill Freehan
 #5 in AL in slugging percentage (.479)

John Hiller
 #6 in AL in games finished (52)
 #7 in AL in saves (13)

Al Kaline
 3rd oldest player in AL (39)

Lerrin LaGrow
 #3 in AL in losses (19)
 #4 in AL in wild pitches (12)
 #8 in AL in earned runs allowed (112)

Mickey Lolich
 MLB leader in home runs allowed (38)
 AL leader in losses (21)
 MLB leader in earned runs allowed (142)
 #2 in MLB in games started (41)
 #2 in MLB in hits allowed (310)
 #3 in MLB in complete games (27)
 #4 in AL in strikeout to walk ratio (2.59)
 #5 in AL in strikeouts (202)
 #5 in MLB in batters faced (1263)
 #7 in MLB in innings pitched (308)

Aurelio Rodríguez
 AL leader in games at third base (159)
 AL leader in innings at third base (1391-2/3)
 #4 in AL in games played (159)
 #5 in AL in outs (470)

Gary Sutherland
 AL leader in outs (489)
 #2 in AL in at bats per strikeout (16.7)
 #3 in AL in at bats (619)
 #4 in AL in singles (131)

Players ranking among top 100 all time at position 
The following members of the 1975 Detroit Tigers are among the Top 100 of all time at their position, as ranked by The Bill James Historical Baseball Abstract in 2001:
 Bill Freehan: 12th best catcher of all time
 Norm Cash: 20th best first baseman of all time 
 Aurelio Rodríguez: 91st best third baseman of all time
 Al Kaline: 11th best right fielder of all time
 Willie Horton: 55th best left fielder of all time 
 Mickey Lolich: 72nd best pitcher of all time

Farm system 

LEAGUE CHAMPIONS: Bristol

See also

 1974 in Michigan

References

External links 
 1974 Detroit Tigers Regular Season Statistics

Detroit Tigers seasons
Detroit Tigers season
Detroit Tigers
1974 in Detroit